Psychedelic Underground is a 1969 psychedelic rock album by the German band Amon Düül.

Track listing
All Songs Written & Arranged By Amon Düül.

Personnel
Rainer Bauer: electric and twelve-string guitars, vocals
Ulrich Leopold: electric and acoustic basses
Krischke: drums, piano
Angelika Filanda: drums, vocals
Ella Bauer: drums, percussion, vocals
Uschi Obermaier: maracas
Helge Filanda: congas, vocals

Rerelease Information
Since its debut in 1969 on Metronome (and its concurrent Stateside release, the album has been re-issued a total of nine times.  The list is as follows:

 Metronome released the album again in 1973, calling it "This Is Amon Düül" (catalog number: 200 146)
 Brain Records (Germany) called the album "Minnelied" and reissued it in 1979, with the catalog number 0040.149.

From then on, the various reissues would keep the original album title.

 Captain Trip Records (Japan; catalog number CTCD-021) in 1995
 Spalax Music (France; catalog number CD 14947) in 1996
 Repertoire Records (Germany; catalog number REP 4616-WY) in 1997
 Kekere Aquarium (catalog number KA 0-18) and 100% Recordings (catalog number 3%; both in Croatia) in 1998
 Arcàngelo Records (Japan; catalog number ARC 7034) in 2003
 Metronome re-issued the album two more times; once in 2009, and then again one year later (both with the catalog number MLP 15 332)

References

1969 albums
Amon Düül albums
German-language albums